The Last Warhorse is a 1986 Australian film about a Japanese businessman who tries to acquire a property belonging to a horse owning family. It was shot in Wahroonga and Glebe.

Plot
Ishikawa, a Japanese businessman (Kazue Matsumoto), takes up residence in Sydney to direct the construction of a waterfront development. However, his employees secretly use his name to acquire the adjoining property to get access to horses.

Cast
Graham Dow
Ritchie Singer
Kazue Matsumoto
Robert Carlton
Olivia Martin
Kristin Veriga
Kazue Matsumoto

References

External links
The Last Warhorse at Screen Australia
The Last Warhorse at BFI

Australian television films
1986 films
1980s English-language films
1980s Australian films